Marcellinus may refer to:

Ancient
 Marcellinus (consul 275), Roman imperial official
 Marcellinus (magister officiorum) (died 351), officer of Emperor Constans and of usurper Magnentius
 Marcellinus (magister militum) (died 468), a Roman general in the invasion of Africa against Geiseric
 Marcellinus (writer), author of a Life of Thucydides, 6th century
 Marcus Egnatius Marcellinus, a senator of Imperial Rome,  Consul Suffectus in 116 
 Marcellinus and Peter (died 304), two Christian martyrs
 Pope Marcellinus (died 304), third century pope
 Ammianus Marcellinus (c. 330–c. 400), Roman historian
 Narcissus, Argeus, and Marcellinus (died 320), martyrs at Tomi
 Marcellinus of Gaul (died 374), saint and evangelist
 Marcellinus of Carthage (died 413), saint and martyr
 Marcellinus Comes (Count Marcellinus, died 534), 6th-century chronicler

Modern
 Marcellinus Champagnat (1789–1840), priest and saint, founder of the Marist Brothers
 Marcellinus of Civezza (1822–1906), Italian Franciscan author

See also
Saint Marcellinus (disambiguation)